McCloud Railway No. 25 is a 2-6-2 "Prairie" type steam locomotive that worked on the McCloud River Railroad. It was purchased new from the American Locomotive Company (ALCO) in 1925. Shortly after retirement, on July 3, 1955, the No. 25 ceremoniously opened the Burney Branch by bursting through a paper banner with a special excursion train. In 1962, No. 25 was restored for excursion service and served in that capacity until passenger service was once again terminated in 1975. It has since been used in the films Bound for Glory, Stand By Me and Changeling and is presently in Oregon, providing excursion service on the Oregon Coast Scenic Railroad.

History
The No. 25 was one of four Prairies from ALCO, numbered 22–25, which were purchased for a total cost of $90,000. The No. 25 was the largest and last steam locomotive purchased by the McCloud River Railroad. At the time, the McCloud was a logging railway and the No. 25 was used in this function until July 3, 1955, when it was replaced by GE 70-ton switcher No. 1.

Post-retirement excursions
It wasn't long, however, before the locomotive was brought out again on July 3, 1955 to open the Burney Branch by breaking a paper banner with a special excursion train.  After this, however, the locomotive was truly retired, but it remained on the property—the only steam locomotive to do so.

In the following years, there were many requests for the No. 25 to be restored for excursion service.  This was finally done in 1962. The locomotive ran special excursions, usually for railfan organizations. A contractor called the Mt. Shasta Alpine Scenic Railway ran regular excursions in the summer of 1964, and another contractor called the Shasta Huffen-Puff ran the service between 1967 and 1971, when equipment prices, insurance prices, and falling interest.

This era of excursions ended in 1975, when the locomotive travelled to the Tidewater Southern Railway to be used in Bound for Glory. After that, it was retired for the second time.

The McCloud River Railroad came under new ownership in 1977, and the new owners ordered President Bill Herndon to scrap the No. 25, but he resisted.

Great Western Railroad Museum
Beginning in late spring of 1982, the No. 25 was put on long-term lease to the Great Western Railroad Museum, which ran it on the McCloud in several annual excursions. This third career also ended with a performance in a movie: Stand by Me, filmed in 1986. Right after this, the Great Western Railroad Museum sued the McCloud River Railroad for Breach of Contract, and in the settlement, obtained possession of the locomotive. They did not do anything with it, however, keeping it in storage on the McCloud property.

McCloud Railway 
The renewed McCloud Railway re-obtained the No. 25 in January 1996 and began restoration efforts.  The locomotive's fourth career began on Labor Day in 1997. No. 25 again returned to occasional excursion service, but in February 2001, McCloud Railway 18 reentered service, and after a doubleheader excursion, the No. 18 replaced the No. 25. The No. 25 was stored again, and it was restored once again between the summer of 2007 and the summer of 2008. It made two excursions for railfan groups on November 1 and 2, but because most of the McCloud Railway is being abandoned, the locomotive ran on its homerails for the last time, and was put up for sale.

Oregon Coast Scenic Railroad
In late March, 2011, No. 25 was moved from McCloud, California to Tillamook, Oregon after it was purchased by the Oregon Coast Scenic Railroad. The locomotive is stored in the World War II-era blimp hangar and was steamed up on May 20 with passenger excursions planned to begin in the summer. It was moved to the Oregon Coast Scenic Railroad shop in Garibaldi, Oregon in July 2011 and is still in service as of 2023.

References

See Also

 McCloud Railway 18
 McCloud Railway 19
 Polson Logging Co. 2
 Sierra Railway 28

External links

2-6-2 locomotives
ALCO locomotives
Individual locomotives of the United States
Railway locomotives introduced in 1925
Standard gauge locomotives of the United States
Preserved steam locomotives of Oregon